Chrysoteuchia fractellus is a moth in the family Crambidae. It was described by South in 1901. It is found in China (Sichuan).

References

Crambini
Moths described in 1901
Moths of Asia